This is a list of postage stamps and souvenir sheets issued by Pakistan Post from 1987 to 1996.

 1947 to 1966
 1967 to 1976
 1977 to 1986
 1987 to 1996
 1997 to 2006
 2007 to 2016
 2017 to present

1987
 1987 –1 125th Anniversary of St. Patrick's School, Karachi – 29 January 1987
  One stamp was issued on this occasion
  Value:  Rs. 5

 1987 –2 Savings Bank Week – 21 February 1987
  Four stamps & Two Labels were issued in se-tanent strip of Six throughout the sheet.
  Value:  Rs. 5, Rs. 5, Rs. 5, Rs. 5

 1987 –3 New Parliament House – 23 March 1987
  One stamp was issued on this occasion
  Value:  Rs. 3

 1987 –4 Drug Free Society Preventive Education Against Drug Abuse – 30 June 1987
  One stamp was issued on this occasion
  Value:  Rs. 1

 1987 –5 Independence Day – 14 August 1987
  Two stamps were issued on this occasion
  Value:  80p, Rs. 3

 1987 –6 Air Force Day – 7 September 1987
  Ten stamps were issued in se-tanent strip of ten in a sheetlet.
  Value:  Rs. 3, Rs. 3, Rs. 3, Rs. 3, Rs. 3, Rs. 3, Rs. 3, Rs. 3, Rs. 3, Rs. 3,

 1987 –7 Pakistan Tourism Convention – 1 October 1987
  Four stamps were issued in se-tanent Block of Four throughout the sheet.
  Value:  Rs. 1.50, Rs. 1.50, Rs. 1.50, Rs. 1.50

 1987 –8 Hazrat Shah Abdul Latif Bhitai – 8 October 1987
  One stamp was issued on this occasion
  Value:  80p

 1987 –9 Centenary of D.J. Sind Government Science College, Karachi – 7 November 1987
  One stamp was issued on this occasion
  Value:  80p

 1987 –10 Silver Jubilee Conference College of Physicians and Surgeons – 9 December 1987
  One stamp was issued on this occasion
  Value:  Rs. 1

 1987 –11 International Year of Shelter for the Homeless – 15 December 1987
  One stamp was issued on this occasion
  Value:  Rs. 3

 1987 –12 Centenary of Cathedral Church – 20 December 1987
  One stamp was issued on this occasion
  Value: Rs. 3

 1987 –13 40 Years of Pak Post Office – 28 December 1987
  One stamp was issued on this occasion
  Value: Rs. 3

 1987 –14 Radio Pakistan New Concept of Broadcasting – 31 December 1987
  One stamp was issued on this occasion
  Value: 80p

1988
 1988 – 1 Birth Centenary of Jamshed Nusserwanjee Mehta – 7 January 1988
 1988 – 2 World Leprosy Day – 31 January 1988
 1988 – 3 40th Anniversary of the World Health Organization – 7 April 1988
 1988 – 4 125th Anniversary of Red Crescent Movement – 8 May 1988
 1988 – 5 Independence Day – 14 August 1988
 1988 – 6 Seoul Olympics – 17 September 1988
 1988 – 7 Wildlife Series – 29 October 1988
 1988 – 8 75th Anniversary of Islamia College, Peshawar
 1988 – 9 SAARC Summit 88 – 29 December 1988

1989
 1989 – 1 Maulana Hasrat Mohani (Pioneers of Freedom Series) – 23 January 1989
 1989 – 2 16th Asian Advertising Congress ADASIA 89 – 18 January 1989
 1989 – 3 10th Death Anniversary of Zulfikar Ali Bhutto Shaheed – 4 April 1989
 1989 – 4 25 Years of Submarine – 1 June 1989
 1989 – 5 Bicentenary of the French Revolution – 24 June 1989
 1989 – 6 Archaeological Heritage of Pakistan – 29 June 1989
 1989 – 7 10th Anniversary of APT – 1 July 1989
 1989 – 8 Foundation Stone Laying of the First Integrated Container Terminal, Port Qasim – 5 August 1989
 1989 – 9 Quaid-e-Azam Mohammad Ali Jinnah – Definitive Series – 14 August 1989
 1989 – 10 300th Birth Anniversary of Shah Abdul Latif Bhitai – 16 September 1989
 1989 – 11 Wildlife Series "Himalayan Black Bear" – 7 October 1989
 1989 – 12 World Food Day – 16 October 1989
 1989 – 13 4th SAF Games, Islamabad – 20 October 1989
 1989 – 14 800th Birth Anniversary of Baba Farid – 20 October 1989
 1989 – 15 Silver Jubilee of PTV – 26 November 1989
 1989 – 16 SAARC Year against Narcotics – 8 December 1989
 1989 – 17 100th Anniversary of Murray College – 18 December 1989
 1989 – 18 125th Anniversary of Government College Lahore – 21 December 1989
 1989 – 19 10th Anniversary of CIRDAP – 31 December 1989

1990
 1990 – 1 20th Anniversary of OIC – 9 February 1990
 1990 – 2 7th World Cup Hockey Cup – 12 February 1990
 1990 – 3 Pakistan Resolution Golden Jubilee – 23 March 1990
 1990 – 4 Save Motherhood South Asia Conference – 24 March 1990
 1990 – 5 Painters of Pakistan Series: Shakir Ali – 19 April 1990
 1990 – 6 Pakistan First Experimental Space Satellite Badr-1 – 26 July 1990
 1990 – 7 Independence Day Pioneers of Freedom (Series) – 14 August 1990
 1990 – 8 IPE Commemoration – 19 August 1990
 1990 – 9 International Literacy Year – 8 September 1990
 1990 – 10 Joint Meeting of RCPE and CPSP – 22 September 1990
 1990 – 11 World Summit for Children – 29 September 1990
 1990 – 12 SAARC Year of Girl Child – 21 November 1990
 1990 – 13 Silver Jubilee of Security Printing Press – 8 December 1990

1991
 1991 – 1 International Civil Defence Day – 1 March 1991
 1991 – 2 South & West Asia Postal Union Commemoration – 12 March 1991
 1991 – 3 World Population Day – 11 July 1991
 1991 – 4 Special Olympics International – 19 July 1991
 1991 – 5 Pioneers of Freedom – 14 August 1991
 1991 – 6 Golden Jubilee Habib Bank Ltd – 25 August 1991
 1991 – 7 St Joseph Convent School – 8 September 1991
 1991 – 8 Emperor Sher Shah – 5 October 1991
 1991 – 9 Pakistan Scientific Expedition to Antarctica
 1991 – 10 Wildlife Series – 4 November 1991
 1991 – 11 25 Years of the Asian Development Bank – 19 December 1991
 1991 – 12 300th Anniversary of Hazrat Sultan Bahoo – 22 December 1991
 1991 – 13 Painters of Pakistan – 24 December 1991
 1991 – 14 100th Anniversary of American Express Travellers Cheques – 26 December 91

1992
 1992 – 1 Muslim Commercial Bank First Year of Privatisation – 8 April 1992
 1992 – 2 National Seminar on Philately – 15 April 1992
 1992 – 3 World Cricket Cup 1992 – 27 April 1992
 1992 – 4 International Space Year – 7 June 1992
 1992 – 5 New Definitive Stamps (Export Series) – 5 July 1992
 1992 – 6 Population Day – 25 July 1992
 1992 – 7 Pioneers of Freedom Series – 14 August 1992
 1992 – 8 4th Islamic Scouts Conference and 6th Islamic Scouts Jamboree Islamabad – 23 August 1992
 1992 – 9 Government Islamia College Centenary Celebrations – 1 November 1992
 1992 – 10 Medicinal Plants of Pakistan "Banfsha – Violet" – 22 November 1992
 1992 – 11 Extra Ordinary Session of ECO Council of Ministers – 28 November 1992
 1992 – 12 International Conference on Nutrition – 5 December 1992
 1992 – 13 Islamic Cultural Heritage – 14 December 1992
 1992 – 14 Wildlife Series (Ducks) – 31 December 1992

1993

 Dresses of Pakistan – 10 March 1993
 21st Conference of Foreign Ministers of Islamic Countries – 25 April 1993
 World Telecommunication Day – 17 May 1993
 Medicinal Plants of Pakistan "Saunf" – 21 June 1993
 Pioneers of Freedom – 14 August 1993
 Gordon college Rawalpindi Centenary Celebrations – 1 September 1993
 Juniper Forest at Ziarat – 30 September 1993
 World Food Day – 16 October 1993
 50th Anniversary of Burn Hall Institutions, Abbottabad – 28 October 1993
 South & West Asia Postal Union – 18 November 1993
 Medicinal Congress 1993 – 10 December 1993
 117th Birth Anniversary of Quaid-e-Azam – 25 December 1993

1994
 1994 – 1 75th Anniversary of ILO – 11 April 1994
 1994 – 2 Eve of Bio-Diversity Day – 20 April 1994
 1994 – 3 International Year of the Family 1994 – 15 May 1994
 1994 – 4 World Population Day – 11 July 1994
 1994 – 5 Pioneers of Freedom – 14 August 1994
 1994 – 6 Indonesia Pakistan Economic & Cultural Cooperation Organization (IPECC) – 19 August 1994
 1994 – 7 International Literacy Day – 8 September 1994
 1994 – 8 Quaid-e-Azam Mohammad Ali Jinnah (Definitive Series)
 1994 – 9 2nd SAARC & 12th National Scouts Jamboree, Quetta – 22 September 1994
 1994 – 10 First International Festival of Islamic Artisans at Work – 7 October 1994
 1994 – 11 Medicinal Plants of Pakistan "Ajwain" – 18 October 1994
 1994 – 12 Celebration of 1000 years of "Shahnama"
 1994 – 13 Centenary of Lahore Museum – 27 December 1994
 1994 – 14 Pakistan World Cup Champions – 31 December 1994

1995
 1995 – 1 20th Anniversary of World Tourism Organization – 2 January 1995
 1995 – 2 Juniper Forests – 14 February 1995
 1995 – 3 Poets of Pakistan "Khushal Khan Khattak" – 28 February 1995
 1995 – 4 Third ECO Summit – 14 March 1995
 1995 – 5 Wildlife Series – Reptiles of Pakistan "Snakes" – 15 April 1995
 1995 – 6 Earth Day – 20 April 1995
 1995 – 7 Traditional Means of Transport and Communication (Series) – 22 May 1995
 1995 – 8 First Conference of Women Parliamentarians from Muslim Countries – 1 August 1995
 1995 – 9 Pioneers of Freedom Series – 14 August 1995
 1995 – 10 Wildlife Series "Butterflies" – 1 September 1995
 1995 – 11 Wildlife Series "Fishes" – 1 September 1995
 1995 – 12 Defence Day "Nishan-e-Haider – Major Aziz Bhatti Shaheed" – 6 September 1995
 1995 – 13 Definitive series – September 1995
 1995 – 14 Centenary of Presentation Convent School, Rawalpindi – 8 September 1995
 1995 – 15 4th World Conference of Women (China) – 15 September 1995
 1995 – 16 100th Death Anniversary of Louis Pasteur – 28 September 1995
 1995 – 17 Birth Centenary of Liaqat Ali Khan, First Prime Minister of Pakistan – 1 October 1995
 1995 – 18 50 Years of Service to Humanity of United Nations – 16 October 195
 1995 – 19 50th Anniversary of the Founding of United Nations – 24 October 1995
 1995 – 20 60 Years of Women's Education "Kinnaird College for Women, Lahore" – 3 November 1995
 1995 – 21 International Conference of Writers & Intellectuals, Islamabad – 30 November 1995
 1995 – 22 1st Decade of SAARC 1985–1995 – 8 December 1995
 1995 – 23 National Water Sports Gala, Karachi 1995 – 14 December 1995
 1995 – 24 20 Years of Allama Iqbal Open University – 16 December 1995
 1995 – 25 Silver Jubilee University of Baluchistan, Quetta – 31 December 1995

1996
 1996 – 1 17th Martyrdom Anniversary of Zulfikar Ali Bhutto – 4 April 1996
 1996 – 2 Centennial Olympic Games, Atlanta 1996 – 3 August 1996
 1996 – 3 Pioneers of Freedom – 14 August 1996
 1996 – 4 Restoration of National Heritage – 21 August 1996
 1996 – 5 International Literacy Year – 8 September 1996
 1996 – 6 Medicinal Plants of Pakistan "Yarrow" – 25 November 1996
 1996 – Birth of (Abubakr Khan Ghalzai) – 13 December 1996

References
 The Most Comprehensive Pakistan Postage Stamps Colour Catalogue 2006 – 2007, Edited by: MI Choudhary, Lahore, Pakistan
 Popular's Pakistan Postage Stamps Catalogue 6th Edition, Edited by: A. Latif Rashed, Lahore, Pakistan, 2006

External links
 Collect Pakistan Postage Stamps Stamp Catalogue. Akhtar ul Islam Siddiqui Editor, Faisalabad, Pakistan.

1987